Disney Sing It: Party Hits is a karaoke video game released on September 24, 2010, throughout Europe and on October 12, 2010, in the United States for the PlayStation 3 and Wii.

It's the fifth game in the Disney Sing It series. The game features songs from Disney-affiliated artists and Disney Channel productions like Camp Rock 2, Demi Lovato, Ashley Tisdale and Selena Gomez & the Scene. It also features a selection of songs from non-Disney artists like Jason Mraz, Iyaz and Colbie Caillat and a "Singing lessons" mode with Demi Lovato as a vocal coach. 

This is the first game in the series to include a music store for downloadable content (not available to the Wii version)

It was followed by a sixth and final game, Disney Sing It: Family Hits.

Songs 
Disney Sing It: Party Hits features a number of songs by Disney-affiliated artists as well as Disney Channel related shows and films, Camp Rock 2: The Final Jam, Hollywood Records and some other label signed artists and bands.

Track list

Downloadable content (Exclusive to PS3 version)

See also
High School Musical: Sing It!
Disney Sing It
Disney Sing It! – High School Musical 3: Senior Year
Disney Sing It: Pop Hits
Disney Sing It: Family Hits

External links 
 Sing It Official mini-site
 Gamezone

2010 video games
Disney video games
Karaoke video games
Multiplayer and single-player video games
PlayStation 3 games
Video games developed in the United Kingdom
Wii games
Zoë Mode games